Waleran was a medieval Bishop of Rochester.

Waleran was archdeacon of the diocese of Bayeux and a clerk serving Richard of Dover, Archbishop of Canterbury.

Waleran was elected on 9 October or 10 October 1182 and was ordained a priest on 18 December 1182. He was consecrated on 19 December 1182.

Waleran died on 29 August 1184.

Citations

References
 British History Online Bishops of Rochester accessed on 30 October 2007
 
 

Bishops of Rochester
12th-century English Roman Catholic bishops
1184 deaths
Anglo-Normans
Year of birth unknown